Deans Crossing is an unincorporated community in Evans County, in the U.S. state of Georgia.

History
A variant name was "Dean". A post office called Dean was established in 1894, and remained in operation until 1905. The community was named after Dean G. Hodges.

References

Unincorporated communities in Evans County, Georgia